Dyotopasta is a genus of moths belonging to the family Tineidae. It contains only one species, Dyotopasta yumaella, which is found in the south-western part of the United States, including Arizona, New Mexico and Texas.

The wingspan is about 25 mm.

References

Tineidae
Monotypic moth genera
Moths of North America
Taxa named by August Busck
Tineidae genera